Kent Township is located in Stephenson County, Illinois. As of the 2010 census, its population was 702 and it contained 270 housing units. The unincorporated community of Kent is located in the township.

Geography
Kent is Township 27 North, Ranges 5 (part) and 6 (part) East of the Fourth Principal Meridian.

Demographics

References

External links
City-data.com
Stephenson County Official Site

Townships in Stephenson County, Illinois
Townships in Illinois